Günter Victor Schulz (born October 4, 1905, in Łódź; died February 25, 1999, in Mainz) was a German chemist. He made seminal contributions to macromolecular chemistry. His name lives on in the Flory-Schulz distribution and the Schulz-Zimm distribution.

Literature 
 August Ludwig Degener, Walter Habel: Wer ist wer? Das deutsche Who's Who, Band 16., Arani, Berlin, 1970  ISBN 3-7605-2007-3, S. 1202.
 Werner Schuder (Hrsg.): Kürschners Deutscher Gelehrten-Kalender. Band 3. 13. Ausgabe. De Gruyter, Berlin/New York 1980, ISBN 3-110-07434-6. S. 3580.

References

1905 births
1999 deaths
German chemists